Porthmeor (from , meaning "large cove") is a hamlet that consists of two farms, Higher and Lower Porthmeor, in the parish of Zennor in Cornwall, England. It should not be confused with Porthmeor beach at St Ives. Higher Porthmeor lies along the B3306 road which connects St Ives to the A30 road and Lower Porthmeor is nearer the coast.

Porthmeor lies within the Cornwall Area of Outstanding Natural Beauty (AONB). Almost a third of Cornwall has AONB designation, with the same status and protection as a National Park.

See also

 List of farms in Cornwall

References

Hamlets in Cornwall
Zennor